In physics and classical mechanics, the three-body problem is the problem of taking the initial positions and velocities (or momenta) of three point masses and solving for their subsequent motion according to Newton's laws of motion and Newton's law of universal gravitation. The three-body problem is a special case of the -body problem. Unlike two-body problems, no general closed-form solution exists, as the resulting dynamical system is chaotic for most initial conditions, and numerical methods are generally required.

Historically, the first specific three-body problem to receive extended study was the one involving the Moon, Earth, and the Sun. In an extended modern sense, a three-body problem is any problem in classical mechanics or quantum mechanics that models the motion of three particles.

Mathematical description

The mathematical statement of the three-body problem can be given in terms of the Newtonian equations of motion for vector positions  of three gravitationally interacting bodies with masses :

where  is the gravitational constant. This is a set of nine second-order differential equations. The problem can also be stated equivalently in the Hamiltonian formalism, in which case it is described by a set of 18 first-order differential equations, one for each component of the positions  and momenta :

where  is the Hamiltonian:

In this case  is simply the total energy of the system, gravitational plus kinetic.

Restricted three-body problem

In the restricted three-body problem, a body of negligible mass (the "planetoid") moves under the influence of two massive bodies. Having negligible mass, the force that the planetoid exerts on the two massive bodies may be neglected, and the system can be analysed and can therefore be described in terms of a two-body motion. Usually this two-body motion is taken to consist of circular orbits around the center of mass, and the planetoid is assumed to  move in the plane defined by the circular orbits.

The restricted three-body problem is easier to analyze theoretically than the full problem. It is of practical interest as well since it accurately describes many real-world problems, the most important example being the Earth–Moon–Sun system. For these reasons, it has occupied an important role in the historical development of the three-body problem.

Mathematically, the problem is stated as follows. Then, the motion of the planetoid is given by

where . In this form the equations of motion carry an explicit time dependence through the coordinates . However, this time dependence can be removed through a transformation to a rotating reference frame, which simplifies any subsequent analysis.

Solutions

General solution

There is no general closed-form solution to the three-body problem, meaning there is no general solution that can be expressed in terms of a finite number of standard mathematical operations. Moreover, the motion of three bodies is generally non-repeating, except in special cases.

This series converges for all real , except for initial conditions corresponding to zero angular momentum. In practice, the latter restriction is insignificant since initial conditions with zero angular momentum are rare, having Lebesgue measure zero.

An important issue in proving this result is the fact that the radius of convergence for this series is determined by the distance to the nearest singularity. Therefore, it is necessary to study the possible singularities of the three-body problems. As will be briefly discussed below, the only singularities in the three-body problem are binary collisions (collisions between two particles at an instant) and triple collisions (collisions between three particles at an instant).

Collisions, whether binary or triple (in fact, any number), are somewhat improbable, since it has been shown that they correspond to a set of initial conditions of measure zero. However, there is no criterion known to be put on the initial state in order to avoid collisions for the corresponding solution. So Sundman's strategy consisted of the following steps:
 Using an appropriate change of variables to continue analyzing the solution beyond the binary collision, in a process known as regularization.
 Proving that triple collisions only occur when the angular momentum  vanishes.
 Showing that if , then not only can there be no triple collision, but the system is strictly bounded away from a triple collision. This implies, by using Cauchy's existence theorem for differential equations, that there are no complex singularities in a strip (depending on the value of ) in the complex plane centered around the real axis (shades of Kovalevskaya).
 Find a conformal transformation that maps this strip into the unit disc. For example, if  (the new variable after the regularization) and if , then this map is given by 

This finishes the proof of Sundman's theorem.

The corresponding series, however, converges very slowly. That is, obtaining a value of meaningful precision requires so many terms that this solution is of little practical use. Indeed, in 1930, David Beloriszky calculated that if Sundman's series were to be used for astronomical observations, then the computations would involve at least 10 terms.

Special-case solutions

In 1767, Leonhard Euler found three families of periodic solutions in which the three masses are collinear at each instant. See Euler's three-body problem.

In 1772, Lagrange found a family of solutions in which the three masses form an equilateral triangle at each instant. Together with Euler's collinear solutions, these solutions form the central configurations for the three-body problem. These solutions are valid for any mass ratios, and the masses move on Keplerian ellipses. These four families are the only known solutions for which there are explicit analytic formulae. In the special case of the circular restricted three-body problem, these solutions, viewed in a frame rotating with the primaries, become points which are referred to as L1, L2, L3, L4, and L5, and called Lagrangian points, with L4 and L5 being symmetric instances of Lagrange's solution.

In work summarized in 1892–1899, Henri Poincaré established the existence of an infinite number of periodic solutions to the restricted three-body problem, together with techniques for continuing these solutions into the general three-body problem.

In 1893, Meissel stated what is now called the Pythagorean three-body problem: three masses in the ratio 3:4:5 are placed at rest at the vertices of a 3:4:5 right triangle. Burrau further investigated this problem in 1913. In 1967 Victor Szebehely and C. Frederick Peters established eventual escape for this problem using numerical integration, while at the same time finding a nearby periodic solution.

In the 1970s, Michel Hénon and Roger A. Broucke each found a set of solutions that form part of the same family of solutions: the Broucke–Henon–Hadjidemetriou family. In this family the three objects all have the same mass and can exhibit both retrograde and direct forms. In some of Broucke's solutions two of the bodies follow the same path.

In 1993, a zero angular momentum solution with three equal masses moving around a figure-eight shape was discovered numerically by physicist Cris Moore at the Santa Fe Institute. Its formal existence was later proved in 2000 by mathematicians Alain Chenciner and Richard Montgomery. The solution has been shown numerically to be stable for small perturbations of the mass and orbital parameters, which makes it possible that such orbits could be observed in the physical universe. However, it has been argued that this occurrence is unlikely since the domain of stability is small. For instance, the probability of a binary–binary scattering event resulting in a figure-8 orbit has been estimated to be a small fraction of a percent.

In 2013, physicists Milovan Šuvakov and Veljko Dmitrašinović at the Institute of Physics in Belgrade discovered 13 new families of solutions for the equal-mass zero-angular-momentum three-body problem.

In 2015, physicist Ana Hudomal discovered 14 new families of solutions for the equal-mass zero-angular-momentum three-body problem.

In 2017, researchers Xiaoming Li and Shijun Liao found 669 new periodic orbits of the equal-mass zero-angular-momentum three-body problem. This was followed in 2018 by an additional 1223 new solutions for a zero-angular-momentum system of unequal masses.

In 2018, Li and Liao reported 234 solutions to the unequal-mass "free-fall" three body problem. The free fall formulation of the three body problem starts with all three bodies at rest. Because of this, the masses in a free-fall configuration do not orbit in a closed "loop", but travel forwards and backwards along an open "track".

Numerical approaches 
Using a computer, the problem may be solved to arbitrarily high precision using numerical integration although high precision requires a large amount of CPU time. There have been attempts of creating computer programs that numerically solve the three-body problem (and by extension, the n-body problem) involving both electromagnetic and gravitational interactions, and incorporating modern theories of physics such as special relativity. In addition, using the theory of random walks, the probability of different outcomes may be computed.

History
The gravitational problem of three bodies in its traditional sense dates in substance from 1687, when Isaac Newton published his Philosophiæ Naturalis Principia Mathematica, when Newton was trying to figure out  if any long term stability is possible, especially the system of our Earth, the Moon, and the Sun. He was guided under the major Renaissance astronomers Nicolaus Copernicus, Tycho Brahe and Johannes Kepler to the beginning of the gravitational three-body problem. In Proposition 66 of Book 1 of the Principia, and its 22 Corollaries, Newton took the first steps in the definition and study of the problem of the movements of three massive bodies subject to their mutually perturbing gravitational attractions. In Propositions 25 to 35 of Book 3, Newton also took the first steps in applying his results of Proposition 66 to the lunar theory, the motion of the Moon under the gravitational influence of Earth and the Sun. Later, this problem was also applied to other planets' interactions with the Earth and the Sun.

The physical problem was firstly addressed by Amerigo Vespucci and subsequently by Galileo Galilei, as well as Simon Stevin, but they did not realize what they contributed. Though Galileo determined that the speed of fall of all bodies changes uniformly and in the same way, he did not apply it to planetary motions. Whereas in 1499, Vespucci used knowledge of the position of the Moon to determine his position in Brazil. It became of technical importance in the 1720s, as an accurate solution would be applicable to navigation, specifically for the determination of longitude at sea, solved in practice by John Harrison's invention of the marine chronometer. However the accuracy of the lunar theory was low, due to the perturbing effect of the Sun and planets on the motion of the Moon around Earth.

Jean le Rond d'Alembert and Alexis Clairaut, who developed a longstanding rivalry, both attempted to analyze the problem in some degree of generality; they submitted their competing first analyses to the Académie Royale des Sciences in 1747. It was in connection with their research, in Paris during the 1740s, that the name "three-body problem" began to be commonly used. An account published in 1761 by Jean le Rond d'Alembert indicates that the name was first used in 1747.

From the end of the 19th century to early 20th century, the approach to solve the three-body problem with the usage of short-range attractive two-body forces was developed by scientists, which offered P.F. Bedaque, H.-W. Hammer and U. van Kolck an idea to renormalize the short-range three-body problem, providing scientists a rare example of a renormalization group limit cycle at the beginning of the 21st century. George William Hill worked on the restricted problem in the late 19th century with an application of motion of Venus and Mercury.

At the beginning of the 20th century,  Karl Sundman approached the problem mathematically and systematically by providing a function theoretical proof to the problem valid for all values of time. It was the first time scientists theoretically solved three-body problem. However, because there was not enough qualitative solution of this system, and it was too slow for scientists to practically apply it, this solution still left some issues unresolved. In the 1970s, implication to three-body from two-body forces had been discovered by V. Efimov which was named as Efimov Effect.

In 2017,  Shijun Liao and Xiaoming Li applied a new strategy of numerical simulation for chaotic systems called the clean numerical simulation (CNS), with the use of a national supercomputer, to successfully gain 695 families of periodic solutions of the three-body system with equal mass.

In 2019, Breen et al. announced a fast neural network solver for the three-body problem, trained using a numerical integrator.

Other problems involving three bodies

The term "three-body problem" is sometimes used in the more general sense to refer to any physical problem involving the interaction of three bodies.

A quantum-mechanical analogue of the gravitational three-body problem in classical mechanics is the helium atom,
in which a helium nucleus and two electrons interact according to the inverse-square Coulomb interaction. Like the
gravitational three-body problem, the helium atom cannot be solved exactly.

In both classical and quantum mechanics, however, there exist nontrivial interaction laws besides the inverse-square force which
do lead to exact analytic three-body solutions. One such model consists of a combination of harmonic attraction and a repulsive inverse-cube force. This model is considered nontrivial since it is associated with a set of nonlinear differential equations containing singularities (compared with, e.g., harmonic interactions alone, which lead to an easily solved system of linear differential equations). In these two respects it is analogous to (insoluble) models having Coulomb interactions, and as a result has been suggested as a tool for intuitively understanding physical systems like the helium atom.

Within the point vortex model, the motion of vortices in a two-dimensional ideal fluid is described by equations of motion that contain only first-order time derivatives. I.e. in contrast to Newtonian mechanics, it is the velocity and not the acceleration that is determined by their relative positions. As a consequence, the three-vortex problem is still integrable, while at least four vortices are required to obtain chaotic behavior. One can draw parallels between the motion of a passive tracer particle in the velocity field of three vortices and the restricted three-body problem of Newtonian mechanics.

The gravitational three-body problem has also been studied using general relativity. Physically, a relativistic treatment becomes necessary in systems with very strong gravitational fields, such as near the event horizon of a black hole. However, the relativistic problem is considerably more difficult than in Newtonian mechanics, and sophisticated numerical techniques are required.
Even the full two-body problem (i.e. for arbitrary ratio of masses) does not have a rigorous analytic solution in general relativity.

-body problem
The three-body problem is a special case of the -body problem, which describes how  objects move under one of the physical forces, such as gravity. However, the Sundman and Wang series converge so slowly that they are useless for practical purposes; therefore, it is currently necessary to approximate solutions by numerical analysis in the form of numerical integration or, for some cases, classical trigonometric series approximations (see -body simulation). Atomic systems, e.g. atoms, ions, and molecules, can be treated in terms of the quantum -body problem. Among classical physical systems, the -body problem usually refers to a galaxy or to a cluster of galaxies; planetary systems, such as stars, planets, and their satellites, can also be treated as -body systems. Some applications are conveniently treated by perturbation theory, in which the system is considered as a two-body problem plus additional forces causing deviations from a hypothetical unperturbed two-body trajectory.

In popular culture
In the classic 1951 science-fiction film The Day the Earth Stood Still, the alien Klaatu, using the pseudonym Mr. Carpenter, makes some annotations to equations on Prof. Barnhardt's blackboard. Those equations are an accurate description of a particular form of the three-body problem.

The first volume of Chinese author Liu Cixin's Remembrance of Earth's Past trilogy is titled The Three-Body Problem and features the three-body problem as a central plot device.

See also

 Few-body systems
 Galaxy formation and evolution
 Gravity assist
 Lagrange point
 Low-energy transfer
 Michael Minovitch
 -body simulation
 Symplectic integrator
 Sitnikov problem
 Triple star system

References

Further reading

External links
 
 Physicists Discover a Whopping 13 New Solutions to Three-Body Problem (Science)
 3body simulator - an example of a computer program that solves the three-body problem numerically

Chaotic maps
Classical mechanics
Dynamical systems
Mathematical physics
Orbits
Equations of astronomy